Daphnopsis folsomii is a plant species native to Panama. It has been found in two different regions: the Darién Province in eastern Panama and the Coclé Province in the central part of the country.

Daphnopsis folsomii is a shrub up to 2 m tall. Leaf blades are thick and leathery, up to 25 cm long, green on the upper side, slightly lighter green below. Pistillate (female) flowers are grouped together into a head of 10-15 flowers. Fruits are white, egg-shaped, up to 20 mm long.

References

Flora of Panama
Thymelaeoideae